New Brighton is a suburb of Johannesburg, South Africa. It is located on the border between Sandton and Randburg mainplaces.

References

Suburbs of Johannesburg